The 2014 Sefton Metropolitan Borough Council election took place on 22 May 2014 to elect one third of the council. It was held as part of the 2014 United Kingdom local elections.

Results
Asterisk (*) denotes an incumbent seeking re-election.

References

2014 English local elections
2014
2010s in Merseyside